Zhongxing Road is the name of a station on Shanghai Metro Line 8. It began operation on December 29, 2007. Lines 3 and 4 pass by without stopping.

Railway stations in Shanghai
Shanghai Metro stations in Jing'an District
Railway stations in China opened in 2007
Line 8, Shanghai Metro